Colfax Township is a township in DeKalb County, in the U.S. state of Missouri.

Colfax Township was established in 1870, taking its name from Vice President Schuyler Colfax.

References

Townships in Missouri
Townships in DeKalb County, Missouri